Digitivalva reticulella is a moth of the family Acrolepiidae found in most of Europe, except Ireland, Great Britain, the Netherlands, France, Portugal, Slovenia, much of the Balkan Peninsula, and Lithuania.

The wingspan is 11–13 mm.

The larvae feed on Filago, Gnaphalium luteoalbum, Helichrysum arenarium, Logfia arvensis, and Omalotheca sylvatica. They mine the leaves of their host plants. Young larvae make a narrow corridor which starts at base of the leaf. The frass is deposited in a narrow line. The larva may vacate the mine and start elsewhere. Later mines or mine sections are much wider than the initial corridor. Here, most of the frass is ejected. Older larvae live freely among the flower heads. Larvae have a yellow body and a brown head. They can be found from March to April.

References

Acrolepiidae
Moths described in 1796
Moths of Europe
Moths of Asia